Rozsochy is a municipality and village in Žďár nad Sázavou District in the Vysočina Region of the Czech Republic. It has about 700 inhabitants.

Administrative parts
Villages of Albrechtice, Blažejovice, Kundratice and Vojetín are administrative parts of Rozsochy.

References

Villages in Žďár nad Sázavou District